Olympian is the 1995 debut album by British rock band Gene, released on 20 March 1995 by Costermonger Records.

It is frequently recognized as one of the crowning achievements of Britpop.

The album sound is noted for being influenced by The Smiths, The Jam & The Small Faces. Aesthetically, the album cover is reminiscent of The Smiths' sleeves.

The album reached number 8 in the UK albums chart, selling 70,000 copies and gaining a silver disc.

The image used for the cover is a still from Ingmar Bergman's The Seventh Seal.

Reception

Stephen Thomas Erlewine of AllMusic said of the album: "While Gene manages to carve out an identity indebted to the Smiths but not dominated by them, they also fail to produce an album of consistently compelling material - considering that it's a debut album, that's not a fatal flaw. And Gene's best material shows they are capable of transcending their influences."

Track listing

Personnel

Gene
 Martin Rossiter - Vocals, Keyboards
 Steve Mason - Guitar
 Kevin Miles - Bass
 Matt James - Drums

Additional musicians
Electra Strings:
 Sian Bell - Cello
 Jocelyn Pook - Viola
 Jules Singleton - 2nd Violin
 Sonia Slany - Lead Violin
 Pete Thomas -	String Arrangements

Production
 Phil Vinall -	Producer
 Pete Hofmann - Engineer
 Andy Vella - Design
 Kevin Westenberg, Melanie Cox and Andrew Carruth - Photography

Certifications

References

External links

Olympian at YouTube (streamed copy where licensed)

1995 debut albums
Gene (band) albums